Wang Xiufen (born 20 February 1974) is a former Chinese weightlifter, and world champion competing in the −53 kg division.

Career
At the 1998 World Weightlifting Championships she won the gold medal in the 53 kg division while also setting 3 new senior world records in the Clean & Jerk and total.

Major results

References

1974 births
Living people
Chinese female weightlifters
World Weightlifting Championships medalists
20th-century Chinese women
21st-century Chinese women